John Rose (24 December 1853 – 6 November 1920) was an English cricketer. Rose was a right-handed batsman who bowled right-arm slow and who occasionally fielded as a wicket-keeper. He was born at Warwick, Warwickshire.

Rose made a single first-class appearance for Surrey against Yorkshire in 1878. Yorkshire won the toss and elected to bat first, making 309 all out, with Rose taking a single wicket in the innings, that of Allen Hill. In response, Surrey were dismissed in their first-innings for just 78, with Rose dismissed for a duck by George Ulyett. Forced to follow-on in their second-innings, Surrey were dismissed for 127, with Rose again dismissed for a duck, this time by Harry Pearson. Yorkshire won the match by an innings and 104 runs. This was his only major appearance for the county.

He died at Tiddington, Warwickshire, on 6 November 1920.

References

External links
John Rose at ESPNcricinfo
John Rose at CricketArchive

1853 births
1920 deaths
People from Warwick
English cricketers
Surrey cricketers